Dolores Peak is a high mountain summit in the San Miguel Mountains range of the Rocky Mountains of North America.

Topographic prominence
Dolores Peak may be higher than neighboring Middle Peak on the same drainage divide.  If this is the case, Dolores Peak would be the more topographically prominent of the two summits.

Historical names
Dolores Mountain
Dolores Peak – 1965 
Dunn Peak
Dunns Peak

See also

List of mountain peaks of North America
List of mountain peaks of the United States
List of mountain peaks of Colorado

References

External links

Mountains of Colorado
Mountains of Dolores County, Colorado
Mountains of San Miguel County, Colorado
San Juan National Forest
Uncompahgre National Forest
North American 4000 m summits